Mammule Rankoe (born 1999) is a South African artistic gymnast. She will represent South Africa at the 2014 Summer Youth Olympics in Nanjing, China. She placed 2nd in the all-around at the African Junior Championships in Pretoria, South Africa. Mammule did her best once again winning a silver medal on long jump and another silver medal on hurdles at the interHigh school sports( Benoni high, Florida high, Germiston high, Vereeniging high and Vorentoe high schools athletics).

Competitive History

Youth Olympics

References 

1999 births
South African female artistic gymnasts
Gymnasts at the 2014 Summer Youth Olympics
Gymnasts at the 2022 Commonwealth Games
Living people
South African gymnasts
20th-century South African women
21st-century South African women